The Lake Houston Sentinel is a weekly community newspaper serving the Crosby, Huffman, Highlands, Barrett and Baytown communities in east and northeast Harris County, Texas, United States. (The Lake Houston Sentinel has been replaced with *The Lake Houston Observer, yourhoustonnews.com/lake_houston)

Newspapers published in Greater Houston
Harris County, Texas
Weekly newspapers published in Texas